Ulrika Eriksson (born 12 July 1973, Stockholm) is a Swedish television presenter and model. Eriksson has worked for MTV Europe, TV3 and TV4 as a presenter for several shows like Silikon, Spårlöst, Äntligen trädgård, Rampfeber and the morning news show Nyhetsmorgon. She also presented the music award show Grammisgalan in 2006.

References

Living people
1973 births
Swedish women television presenters
People from Stockholm